Hans Stephani (January 20, 1935 — September 14, 2003) was a German physicist who mainly worked on the General theory of relativity.

Biography
Stephani obtained his master's degree at Jena in 1958 under the supervision of Gerhard Heber. He finished his PhD under Ernst Schmutzer at University of Jena and joined as lecturer there. His wife Irmtraud Stephani is a mathematician at the same university. He retired in 2000.

Books

References

1935 births
2003 deaths
20th-century German physicists
University of Jena alumni